Fry Group Foods is a family-owned manufacturer of vegan meat substitutes founded by South Africans Wally and Debbie Fry in 1991.

History
Wally Fry is a vegan convert who once ate meat and traded livestock for a living. He decided to follow the example of his vegetarian wife Debbie and daughter Tammy after observing the inhumane conditions in a working pig farming facility built by his own construction firm. The couple created meat substitutes in their Durban home for personal consumption to help Wally adapt to his new meat-free diet. Due to growing demand from others, they eventually registered a company to manufacture meat substitutes on a commercial scale in 1991. As public demand for vegan food in South Africa was marginal at the time, the company had to innovate as a manufacturer in a new market. Since inception, the company has also advocated for a plant-based diet via public awareness campaigns including Meat-Free Monday and Veganuary.

Locations
In 1998 the company began exporting its meat substitutes from South Africa to Australia, where its headquarters have been based since 2014.  its frozen food products, which are manufactured in a custom-built factory in Durban and by a contractor in Cornwall, are sold by supermarket chains and other retailers in over 30 countries.

Products
The product range initially consisted of only a handful of basics including sausages, hot dogs, and burger patties.  it has expanded to include more than 35 products that resemble various meat products—including schnitzels, sausage rolls, chicken nuggets, mince, and polony—which are made without any meat, egg, or dairy ingredients. The unpatented plant-based meat substitutes are made from legumes, grains, natural flavourings, and spices, and do not contain any genetically modified ingredients.

Reception

Endorsements
Vegetarian Society Approved

Awards
Fry Group Foods has won numerous awards for its products. It received the 2010 Ernst & Young Entrepreneur of the Year Award (Emerging category) from the Ernst & Young South Africa chapter, the 2013 Green Lifestyle Award for Food (Company), the 2016 Food Bev SETA Gold Award (Medium Companies category), and the 2017 Anuga Taste Innovation Award for Soy and Flaxseed Schnitzel. It was the recipient of the VegfestUK Award for Best Vegan "Meat" in 2017 and 2018.

See also 

 List of meat substitutes

References

External links
Fry Family Foods – Product FAQs

Food and drink companies established in 1991
South African brands
Frozen food brands
Food and drink companies of Australia
Companies based in Queensland
Vegetarian companies and establishments
Meat substitutes
1991 establishments in South Africa